Muhammet Nuri Kotanoğlu is a Turkish freestyle wrestler. He is a bronze medalist at the European Wrestling Championships.

Career 

He won one of the bronze medals in the 79 kg event at the 2019 European Wrestling Championships held in Bucharest, Romania.

In 2020, he won the silver medal in the men's 79 kg event at the Individual Wrestling World Cup held in Belgrade, Serbia. In 2021, he won the bronze medal in the 79 kg event at the Matteo Pellicone Ranking Series 2021 held in Rome, Italy.

Major results

References

External links 
 

Living people
Year of birth missing (living people)
Place of birth missing (living people)
Turkish male sport wrestlers
European Wrestling Championships medalists
21st-century Turkish people